Abbas Bahri (1 January 1955 – 10 January 2016) was a Tunisian mathematician. He was the winner of the Fermat Prize and the Langevin Prize in mathematics. He was a professor of mathematics at Rutgers University.

He mainly studied the calculus of variations, partial differential equations, and differential geometry. He introduced the method of the critical points at infinity, which is a fundamental step in the calculus of variations.

Biography
Bahri received his secondary education in Tunisia and higher education in France. He attended the École Normale Superieure in Paris in 1974, the first Tunisian to do so.

In 1981, he completed his PhD from Pierre-and-Marie-Curie University. His dissertation advisor was the French mathematician Haïm Brezis. Afterwards, he was a visiting scientist at the University of Chicago.

In October 1981, Bahri became a lecturer in mathematics at the University of Tunis. He taught as a lecturer at the École Polytechnique from 1984 to 1993. In 1988, he became a tenured professor at Rutgers University. At Rutgers, he was director of the Center for Nonlinear Analysis from 1988 to 2002.

Personal life
He married Diana Nunziante on 20 June 1991. His wife is from Italy and they had four children. On 10 January 2016, he died following a long illness at the age of 61.

Awards
In 1989, Bahri won the Fermat Prize for Mathematics, jointly with Kenneth Alan Ribet, for his introduction of new methods in the calculus of variations.

Works
 Pseudo-orbits of contact forms (1988)
 Critical Points at Infinity in Some Variational Problems (1989)
 Classical and Quantic Periodic Motions of Multiply Polarized Spin-Particles (1998)
 Flow lines and algebraic invariants in contact form geometry (2003)
 Recent progress in conformal geometry with Yongzhong Xu (2007)

Selected publications

References

External links
 Official Rutgers website

Rutgers University faculty
1955 births
2016 deaths
Tunisian mathematicians
Variational analysts
Pierre and Marie Curie University alumni
People from Tunis